Inflatocalyx is a genus of soft coral in the Alcyoniidae family. The genus contains the single species Inflatocalyx infirmata, and was described by Verseveldt & Bayer in 1988. The coral is found in the Arctic Ocean.

References 

Alcyoniidae
Monotypic cnidarian genera